Edwin Berry may refer to:

 Edwin C. Berry (1854–1931), American hotelier
 Edwin S. Berry (1845–1934), Australian surveyor and explorer